"Honky Cat" is a song written by English musician Elton John and songwriter Bernie Taupin, and performed by John. It was used as the opening track for John's fifth studio album, Honky Château, released in 1972.

"Honky Cat" was also released as the A-side of John's thirteenth single.

John has performed this song numerous times in the 50 years since its release. A live version of the song was released on the Here side of the Here and There live set in 1976 (and its expanded CD version in 1995), and a solo piano version appeared on the EltonJohn.com Live in Madison Square Garden Vol. 1 limited edition CD, recorded in October 1999 during his 1999 solo tour.

Reception
Winston Cook-Wilson of Spin called it John's "most underrated" single.

In 2018, Dave Simpson of The Guardian ranked the song No. 48 on his list of the 50 greatest Elton John songs. The following year, Justin Kirkland of Esquire ranked the song No. 27 on his list of the 30 best Elton John songs, calling it a "funky, horn-laden hit" and writing that "it's hard to compare the odd mix of electric piano and wheezing saxophone to any other single in Elton's songbook."

Covers
Lee Ann Womack covered the song on the 2018 tribute album Restoration: Reimagining the Songs of Elton John and Bernie Taupin.

Chart performance

Weekly charts

Year-end charts

Personnel
 Elton John – Fender Rhodes electric piano, acoustic piano, vocals
 Davey Johnstone – banjo
 Dee Murray – bass
 Nigel Olsson – drums
 Ivan Jullien – trumpet
 Jacques Bolognesi – trombone
 Jean-Louis Chautemps – saxophone
 Alain Hatot – saxophone

Production 
 Gus Dudgeon – horn arranger, producer
 Ken Scott – engineer

References

1972 singles
Elton John songs
Songs with lyrics by Bernie Taupin
Songs with music by Elton John
Song recordings produced by Gus Dudgeon
1972 songs
Uni Records singles
DJM Records singles